Generis may refer to:

 Generis (typeface)
 Generis, a fictional planet in the Star Wars franchise

See also
 Generic (disambiguation)
Papal encyclicals
Humani generis, a papal encyclical that Pope Pius XII promulgated on 12 August 1950
Humani generis redemptionem, a papal encyclical written by Pope Benedict XV and published on June 19, 1917
Humani generis unitas (Latin for On the Unity of the Human Race), a planned encyclical of Pope Pius XI before his death 
Sui Generis (disambiguation)
Genus (Latin genitive generis)